Shikellamy High School is a public high school located in Sunbury, Pennsylvania, United States. The building was built in 1929. It is part of the Shikellamy School District. It is the sole public high school for the communities of Northumberland, Point Township, Rockefeller Township, Snydertown Borough, the City of Sunbury, and Upper Augusta Township. It was a combined middle/high school between 2011 and 2016, but there is now Shikellamy Middle School for grades 6 through 8 in Northumberland.

Extracurriculars
Shikellamy High School offers many extracurricular activities to its students. It has many clubs, including: foreign language clubs, Future Scientists/Business Leaders of America, science clubs, and community service clubs. The school is well known for its band and theatre, forensics programs and the JROTC.

Athletics
The school contains:

Boys
Baseball - AAA
Basketball- AAA
Bowling - AAAA
Cross country - AA
Football - AAA
Golf - AAA
Soccer - AA
Tennis - AA
Track and field - AAA
Wrestling - AAA

Girls
Basketball - AAA
Bowling - AAAA
Cross country - AA
Field hockey - AA
Golf - AAA
Soccer - AA
Softball - AAA
Tennis - AA
Track and field - AAA

According to PIAA directory July 2013

Notes and references

External links
Shikellamy High School Web Site
Shikellamy School District site
Pennsylvania State Board Academic Standards Standards for the public education K–12 curriculum.

Public high schools in Pennsylvania
High schools in Central Pennsylvania
Susquehanna Valley
Schools in Northumberland County, Pennsylvania
Public middle schools in Pennsylvania
Sunbury, Pennsylvania
Education in Northumberland County, Pennsylvania